Sir Robert Williams may refer to: 
 Sir Robert Williams, 2nd Baronet (c. 1627–1678), MP for Carnarvonshire, 1656–1658, and for Carnarvon Boroughs, 1659
 Sir Robert Williams, 9th Baronet (1764–1830) of Penryn, MP for Carnarvonshire, 1790–1826, and for Beaumaris, 1826–1831
 Sir Robert Williams, 1st Baronet, of Bridehead (1848–1943), Conservative Member of Parliament for West Dorset, 1895–1922
 Sir Robert Williams, 1st Baronet, of Park (1860–1938), Scottish mining engineer, explorer of  Africa, and railway developer

See also
 Robert Williams (disambiguation)